Elachista vonschantzi is a moth of the family Elachistidae that is found along the coast of the Gulf of Bothnia.

Adults are on wing from June to July.

The larvae feed on Calamagrostis stricta. They mine the leaves of their host plant. The mine descends from the leaf tip and occupies the entire width of the leaf. Pupation takes place outside of the mine.

References

vonschantzi
Moths described in 1976
Moths of Europe